Christen Henriksen Pram (4 September 1756 – 28 November 1821) was a Norwegian/Danish economist, civil servant, poet, novelist, playwright, diarist and magazine editor. He is held as the first Norwegian novelist, although his writing was carried out in the Danish language.

Personal life
Christen was born in Lesja, a son of Minister Henrik Frederik Pram and Olava Maria de Stockfleth. When he was eight years old, he moved with his family to Denmark, when his father assumed a position as vicar in Sjælland. He married Maria Magdalena Erichsen in 1782. He died on the island of Saint Thomas, in the Danish West Indies, in 1821.

Career
Pram was an enthusiastic member of the Norwegian Society in Copenhagen, and assumed various positions in Commercekollegiet (the Copenhagen College of Commerce), where he was appointed in 1781. He made his literary breakthrough in 1782, with the poem "Emilias Kilde". His best known literary work is the epic cycle of poems Stærkodder of 1785, based on the legendary hero Starkaðr from Saxo Grammaticus monumental work Gesta Danorum. He co-founded and co-edited the cultural magazine Minerva from 1785, in cooperation with Knud Lyne Rahbek. He was the sole editor of Minerva from 1789, but after having received warnings over his enthusiasm for the French Revolution, he resigned as editor in 1793.

He is regarded as the first Norwegian novelist. Among his novels are Jørgen, en Dosmers Levnedsbeskrivelse (Jørgen, the Biography of a fool) and Hans Kruuskop of 1786, and  John Thral. Bidrag til Frihedens Historie (John Thral. A Contribution to the History of Freedom) of 1787. He wrote the comedy Ægteskabsskolen (The School for Marriage) in 1795. In the same year he delivered a prize-winning contribution to the preparations for a university in Norway.

Bibliography
 Philippa til Erik (1779)
 Emilias Kilde (1782)
 Hymne til Vaaren (1784)
 Stærkodder. Et Digt i femten Sange (1785)
 Jørgen, en Dosmers Levnedsbeskrivelse, novel (1786)
 Hans Kruuskop, novel (1786)
 John Thral. Bidrag til Frihedens Historie (1787)
 Om en Husmoders Pligter (1787)
 Lagertha (1789), historic drama
 Damon og Pythias (1790), historic drama
 Frode og Fingal (1790), historic drama
 Forsøg om Dragten, især for Danmark og Norge (1791)
 Negeren (1791), drama
 Ægteskabsskolen. Lystspil i fem Akter (1795), drama
 Serenaden eller de sorte Næser (1795), drama
 Forsøg om en Højskoles Anlæg i Norge (1795)
 Undersøgelse om den kjøbenhavnske Waisenhusstiftelse (1796)
 Brønden (1800), drama
 Frokosten i Bellevue (1803), drama

References

External links
 

1756 births
1821 deaths
People from Lesja
18th-century Norwegian poets
18th-century Danish poets
18th-century Norwegian writers
19th-century Norwegian male writers
Danish diarists
Danish male novelists
Danish male poets
19th-century Norwegian novelists
Norwegian male poets
18th-century Norwegian novelists
Norwegian diarists
Norwegian male novelists
18th-century Danish novelists
19th-century Danish novelists
18th-century male writers